Vetluzhsky District is an administrative district (raion), one of the forty in Nizhny Novgorod Oblast, Russia. Municipally, it is incorporated as Vetluzhsky Municipal District. It is located in the north of the oblast. Its administrative center is the town of Vetluga. Population: 16,330 (2010 Census);  The population of Vetluga accounts for 54.8% of the district's total population.

History
The district was established in 1929.

Notable residents 

Mikhail Artemyevich Muravyov (1880–1918), military officer, born in the village of Burdukovo, near Vetluga
Aleksey Pisemsky (1821–1881), novelist and dramatist, lived his first ten years at Vetluga
Vasily Rozanov (1856–1919), writer and philosopher, born in Vetluga
Viktor Rozov (1913–2004), dramatist and screenwriter, received primary education at Vetluga from 1918

References

Notes

Sources

Districts of Nizhny Novgorod Oblast
States and territories established in 1929
 
